West Union is a town in Oconee County, South Carolina, United States. Although its name suggests that it is near Union, they are approximately four counties apart. The population was 291 at the 2010 census.

Geography
West Union is located at  (34.758141, -83.041740).  The town is located along South Carolina Highway 11, mostly northeast of the highway's intersection with South Carolina Highway 28.  The larger city of Walhalla borders the town to the west, and Lake Keowee lies just a few miles to the east.

According to the United States Census Bureau, the town has a total area of 0.8 square mile (2.0 km2), all land.

Demographics

As of the census of 2000, there were 297 people, 134 households, and 79 families residing in the town. The population density was 386.2 people per square mile (148.9/km2). There were 145 housing units at an average density of 188.6 per square mile (72.7/km2). The racial makeup of the town was 87.54% White, 0.67% African American, 3.03% Native American, 7.74% from other races, and 1.01% from two or more races. Hispanic or Latino of any race were 15.82% of the population.

There were 134 households, out of which 21.6% had children under the age of 18 living with them, 49.3% were married couples living together, 6.7% had a female householder with no husband present, and 41.0% were non-families. 38.1% of all households were made up of individuals, and 15.7% had someone living alone who was 65 years of age or older. The average household size was 2.22 and the average family size was 2.95.

In the town, the population was spread out, with 19.5% under the age of 18, 12.8% from 18 to 24, 20.9% from 25 to 44, 30.3% from 45 to 64, and 16.5% who were 65 years of age or older. The median age was 44 years. For every 100 females, there were 104.8 males. For every 100 females age 18 and over, there were 106.0 males.

The median income for a household in the town was $24,250, and the median income for a family was $35,000. Males had a median income of $25,625 versus $21,875 for females. The per capita income for the town was $13,753. About 18.9% of families and 27.1% of the population were below the poverty line, including 43.1% of those under the age of eighteen and 2.9% of those 65 or over.

References

External links

Information about West Union

Towns in Oconee County, South Carolina
Towns in South Carolina